Clube de Futebol Os Armacenenses (abbreviated as CF Armacenenses) is a Portuguese football club based in Armação de Pêra, Silves in the Algarve.

Background
CF Armacenenses currently plays in the Campeonato de Portugal which is the third tier of Portuguese football.  The club was founded in 1935 and they play their home matches at the Campo Das Gaivotas in Armação de Pêra, Silves.

The club is affiliated to Associação de Futebol do Algarve and has competed in the AF Algarve Taça.  The club has also entered the national cup known as Taça de Portugal and has completed 4 games in the competition.

Season to season

Footnotes

External links
Official website 

 
Football clubs in Portugal
Association football clubs established in 1935
1935 establishments in Portugal
Silves, Portugal